Achfrish is a hamlet situated towards the southeastern part of Loch Shin on the north side of the Loch in Highland, Scotland. It is also part of the wider community of Shinness which is made up of Achfrish, Tirryside, Achnairn, Colabul, Blairbuie and West Shinness.  Achfrish is on the hill overlooking Loch Shin with views of Ben More Assynt to the West and Ben Klibreck to the North.  Achfrish is approximately 4 miles from the larger village of Lairg (in the county of Sutherland) which has a selection of shops, primary school and doctor's surgery.  Secondary education is catered for in the coastal towns of Golspie and Dornoch.

Business in the area include Woodend Caravan and Camping site in Achnairn, Highland Farrier Company in Achfrish, Sutherland Pottery in Achfrish, Baby at Sones an internet business in Tirryside, Sutherland Shellfish and Game in Achnairn and many small-scale crofter (farmers) breeding sheep and cattle.  Tirryside, Achfrish and Achnairn form a loop road off the A838.

The area is a crofting community made up of mainly detached and semi-detached houses, some of these are holiday homes which are occupied for just a few weeks a year.

The prefix Ach is shortened from Achadh, meaning agricultural holding or field.

Attractions:

Highland Farrier Company available at:  http://highlandfarriercompany.doodlekit.com/home [accessed 9-10-2012]

The Falls of Shin visitor centre is approximately 10 miles away, at certain times of the year it is possible to watch the salmon leaping up the waterfall from the viewing area.  Further information:  https://web.archive.org/web/20120305050454/http://www.fallsofshin.co.uk/index.php {accessed 1-3-2012]

Ferrycroft visitor's centre located in Lairg, please see:
https://web.archive.org/web/20120305235800/http://www.highland.gov.uk/leisureandtourism/what-to-see/visitorcentres/ferrycroft.htm [accessed 1-3-2012]

References
https://web.archive.org/web/20120301221350/http://www.ordnancesurvey.co.uk/oswebsite/freefun/didyouknow/placenames/ [accessed 28-2-2012]

The Gaelic Topography of Scotland available at:  https://books.google.com/books?id=RAM-AAAAcAAJ&printsec=frontcover&redir_esc=y#v=onepage&q&f=false [accessed 1-3-2012]
Baby at Sones available at:  http://www.sonesuk.com/ [accessed 1-3-2012]

Populated places in Sutherland